Kevin Kit Parker is a lieutenant colonel in the United States Army Reserve and the Tarr Family Professor of Bioengineering and Applied Physics at Harvard University. His research includes cardiac cell biology and tissue engineering, traumatic brain injury, and biological applications of micro- and nanotechnologies. Additional work in his laboratory has included fashion design, marine biology, and the application of counterinsurgency methods to countering transnational organized crime.

Early life and education 
Parker attended Boston University's College of Engineering and graduated in 1989.  He earned a Master of Science degree in 1993 and a doctoral degree in applied physics in 1998 from Vanderbilt University.

Military career 
Parker is a paratrooper who has served in the United States Army since 1992. After the September 11 attacks, he served two tours of duty in Afghanistan.

In addition to his combat tours, Parker conducted two missions into Afghanistan as part of the Gray Team in 2011.

Civilian career 
Initially, at Harvard the focus of his research was heart muscle cells.  He turned to traumatic brain injury in 2005 after realizing that an Army friend of his, who had received injuries in an IED blast in Iraq in 2005, was suffering from an undiagnosed medical condition rather than a psychological problem.

Other research of Parker's includes designing camouflage using skin cells of cuttlefish and the use of a cotton candy machine to make dressings for wounds.

Parker served on the Defense Science Research Council for nearly a decade, the Defense Science Board Task Force on Autonomy, and has consulted to other US government agencies as well as the medical device and pharma industry.

In 2011, Parker headed Harvard's committee for reintroducing ROTC at the university.

In July 2016, it was announced that The Disease Biophysics Group at Harvard, led by Kit Parker, created a tissue-engineered soft-robotic ray that swims using wave-like fin motions, and turns according to externally applied light cues.

C3 course scandal 
In January 2021, students at the Harvard School of Engineering and Applied Sciences created a petition objecting to Parker's course on C3 policing. Titled "ENG-SCI 298R: Data Fusion in Complex Systems: A Case Study," the course promised to engage graduate student researchers to analyze the efficacy of a C3 techniques in Springfield, MA. The petition objected to the lack of analysis of structural racism, political economy, inequity in criminal justice, residential segregation resulting from the practice of C3, and the failure of C3 in light of repeated investigations into use of excessive force in the Springfield Police Department.

Signatories demanded canceling the class and a wide variety of other actions, including "a full independent, third-party review of Prof. Kit Parker".

The dean of the engineering school soon announced the class was canceled, and committed to reviewing the process of vetting class offerings.

Awards 
Bronze Star
Army Commendation Medal with V device
Combat Infantryman Badge

References

External links 
Kit Parker at Harvard

Biological engineering
United States Army officers
American physicists
Boston University College of Engineering alumni
Vanderbilt University alumni
Living people
Harvard University faculty
Year of birth missing (living people)